The third electoral unit of Republika Srpska is a parliamentary constituency used to elect members to the National Assembly of Republika Srpska since 2014.  It consists of the Municipalities of Petrovac, 
Banja Luka, 
Čelinac, 
Istočni Drvar, 
Ribnik, 
Mrkonjić Grad, 
Jezero, 
Kneževo, 
Kotor Varoš, 
Šipovo and 
Kupres.

Demographics

Representatives

References

Constituencies of Bosnia and Herzegovina